Sellerstown is an Unincorporated community in Columbus County, North Carolina, United States,  from Whiteville. As of 2011, Sellerstown has 50 residents.

As of 2011, many Sellerstown  residents referred to the Bible as "The Book." As of the same year, residents also referred to The Devil in Pew Number Seven, a memoir by Rebecca Nichols, as "The Book" and many copies sit alongside the Bible in area houses. Many residents buy two or three copies of the memoir in one sitting. Area churches use the book in Sunday school classes.

According to Ann White, an employee at the library in Whiteville, many residents did not know the extent of the involvement of Horry James Watts, former commission chairperson of Columbus County, in a harassment campaign against Nichols' father until the book was released, and that the book caused a commotion in the community. The campaign against Nichols' father resulted in the bombing of Nichols' house and the death of Nichols' mother.

The book is currently being made into a film.

References

External links

 Cartrette, Clara. "Sellerstown bombing book author plans book signing in Wilmington." The News Reporter. Monday August 16, 2010.

Unincorporated communities in North Carolina
Unincorporated communities in Columbus County, North Carolina